Harmeet Singh (born 12 November 1990) is a Norwegian professional footballer who plays as a defensive midfielder for Sandefjord.

Club career

Vålerenga
Singh made his league debut under Martin Andresen in a 1–1 draw against Rosenborg BK in 2008. Singh's goal on 23 September 2009 against Molde in the semi-final of the 2009 Norwegian Football Cup, was nominated Goal of the Year in Norway in 2009. In a friendly game with Vålerenga former FC Barcelona manager Pep Guardiola praised Singh heavily after the game in which he scored a goal.  With Vålerenga he won the 2008 Norwegian Football Cup and became runner-up in the 2009 Superfinalen and the 2010 Tippeligaen.

Feyenoord
On 5 July 2012, it was officially announced that he would join Dutch side Feyenoord on a two-year contract with an option for a third and fourth season for a transfer fee of €300,000. In Rotterdam he will play with squad number 16 alongside fellow Norwegian Omar Elabdellaoui who came over on a season long loan from Manchester City. Singh stated that he was delighted to play for a team in which players like Dirk Kuyt, Robin van Persie and Roy Makaay played before.

Singh made a total of seven appearances, six as a substitute during the 2012–13 season, and was an unused substitute in 23 matches. Singh asked to go on loan to another club ahead of the 2013–14 season, and he was close on joining NEC Nijmegen but the transfer did not happen. Towards the end of September 2013, Singh had not featured for Feyenoord during the new season, and stated that he wanted to leave the club in the next transfer window unless he managed to play more for the first team.

Molde
On 19 February 2014, it was announced that Singh had signed a two-year deal with Molde after leaving Feyenoord on a free transfer.

FC Midtjylland
On 1 February 2016, it was confirmed, that FC Midtjylland had signed a 3-year contract with Singh.

Molde Return
On 11 March 2016, Singh's contract with FC Midtjylland was cancelled due to failing to settle in Denmark, and he returned to Molde FK, signing an 18-month contract with the club.

Wisła Płock
On 23 March 2017, Singh signed for Ekstraklasa side Wisła Płock on an 18-month contract. After only two months and one game played, the club announced that Singh had asked for termination of his contract due to personal and family reasons.

HJK
On 15 March 2019, HJK announced the signing of Singh on a two-year contract. After making 11 appearances all season, Singh's contract was terminated with mutual understanding on 9 January 2020.

International career

Singh has represented Norway at the U15, U16, U17, U18, U19 and U21 levels. On 5 June 2009, at just 18 years of age, he made his debut for the U21s in a 1–1 draw against Estonia U21.

Singh made his debut for the senior team when he replaced Simen Brenne at half time in a 1–1 friendly draw against Denmark on 15 January 2012. He featured in all three matches in the 2012 King's Cup.

Style of play
Singh plays as a deep-lying midfielder. He is nicknamed "The Norwegian Iniesta" by international media.

Career statistics

Honours
Singh received a 'Special Recognition Award' at the Asian Football Awards. In 2010, Singh was listed as one of the "100 greatest talents out of the world" by the Spanish football newspaper Don Balón. Singh's goal on 23 September 2009 against Molde in the semi-final of the 2009 Norwegian Football Cup, was nominated Goal of the Year in Norway.

References

External links

 Profile at Vålerenga 
 

1990 births
Living people
Footballers from Oslo
Association football midfielders
Norwegian footballers
Norway international footballers
Norway youth international footballers
Norway under-21 international footballers
Norwegian expatriate footballers
Vålerenga Fotball players
Feyenoord players
Molde FK players
Wisła Płock players
Kalmar FF players
Sarpsborg 08 FF players
Helsingin Jalkapalloklubi players
Sandefjord Fotball players
Eliteserien players
Eredivisie players
Ekstraklasa players
Expatriate footballers in the Netherlands
Expatriate footballers in Poland
Expatriate footballers in Sweden
Expatriate footballers in Finland
Norwegian people of Indian descent
Norwegian Sikhs
Punjabi people
Norwegian people of Punjabi descent
Norwegian expatriate sportspeople in the Netherlands
Norwegian expatriate sportspeople in Poland
Norwegian expatriate sportspeople in Sweden
Norwegian expatriate sportspeople in Finland
Allsvenskan players
Veikkausliiga players